Material religion is a framework used by scholars of religion examining the interaction between religion and material culture. Its specific focus is on the place of objects, images, spaces, and buildings in religious communities.

Some scholars within the study of religion have criticised the material religion approach for often seeking to reintroduce the phenomenology of religion into the discipline.

Definition

The scholar of religion S. Brent Plate was of the view that "religion must be understood as deriving from rudimentary human experiences, from lived, embodied practices". He stated that "to learn about religion we have to come to our senses. Literally. We have to begin to discover... that we cannot know the worlds of any other culture, let alone our own, unless we get inside the sensational operations of human bodies."

History

The material religion framework has been promoted by the scholars such as Birgit Meyer, Sally Promey, S. Brent Plate, David Morgan, etc.

In 2005, the peer-reviewed journal Material Religion was launched. In their editorial statement, the editors described it as "a new project in the study of religious images, objects, spaces, and material practices."

Criticism
The anthropologist Simon Coleman suggested that the term "material religion" was tautological, in that "religion is inherently material in its very constitution."

The scholars of religion Christopher R. Cotter and David G. Robertson suggested that the material religion framework could be an alternative means to explore religion, in contrast to the dominant world religions paradigm which they regarded as problematic. They nevertheless thought that material religion represented "phenomenology by stealth".

Sources

Footnotes

Bibliography

External links
"Material religion" by David Morgan at The Religious Studies Project
"Working, Not Wonking" by Russell T. McCutcheon

Religious studies